Rasmus Sjöstedt (born 28 February 1992) is a Swedish professional footballer who plays as a defender.

Honours
Hapoel Haifa
Israel State Cup: 2017–18

References

External links
 
 

1992 births
Living people
Swedish footballers
Association football defenders
Färjestadens GoIF players
Kalmar FF players
Falkenbergs FF players
Aris Limassol FC players
Hapoel Haifa F.C. players
Panetolikos F.C. players
Allsvenskan players
Cypriot First Division players
Israeli Premier League players
Super League Greece players
Expatriate footballers in Cyprus
Expatriate footballers in Israel
Expatriate footballers in Greece
Swedish expatriate sportspeople in Israel
Swedish expatriate sportspeople in Greece
Swedish expatriate sportspeople in Cyprus